The F125 Baden-Württemberg-class frigates are a series of frigates of the German Navy, which were designed and constructed by ARGE F125, a joint-venture of Thyssen-Krupp and Lürssen. The Baden-Württemberg class have the heaviest displacement of any class of frigate worldwide. They are primarily designed for low and medium intensity maritime stabilization operations, where they are supposed to provide sea-to-land tactical fire support, asymmetric threat control at sea and support of special forces.

Design

Background
This will better suit the frigates in possible future peacekeeping and peacemaking missions. For such reasons, the frigates will also mount non-lethal weapons.

General characteristics
Major design goals are reduced radar, infrared and acoustic signatures (stealth technology), something that was introduced to the German Navy with the s and was further developed with the s and s.

Other important requirements are long maintenance periods: It should be possible to deploy Baden-Württemberg-class frigates for up to two years away from homeports with an average sea operation time of more than 5,000 hours per year (that's nearly 60%) which includes operation under tropical conditions. For this reason, a combined diesel-electric and gas arrangement has been chosen for the machinery. This allows the substitution of large and powerful diesel engines for propulsion and sets of smaller diesel generators for electric power generation with a pool of med-sized diesel generators, reducing the number of different engines.

To enhance survivability of the frigates, important systems are laid out in the two island principle, i.e. present at least twice at different places within the ship. This is also visible in the superstructures, which are split in two larger pyramidal deckhouses. The aerials of the Cassidian TRS-4D active electronically scanned array radar will be distributed over the two pyramids. This will ensure that the ship remains operational in case of severe damage, such as accidents or enemy action. It will also allow the frigates to keep station if needed when something breaks down and no replacement is available.

An initial batch of four frigates was ordered by the German Navy on 26 June 2007. The initial batch of four ships costs around 2.2 billion euros. In April 2007, a contract with Finmeccanica was signed for delivery of Otobreda  Vulcano main guns as well as remote-controlled light gun turrets for the Baden-Württemberg class. The initially considered  MONARC gun, as well as the naval GMLRS rocket launcher, were dropped due to problems with the navalization of these land-based systems. The deal with Oto Melara had become opportune, because Germany still had countertrade obligations towards Italy, as Italy had purchased two German Type 212 submarines.

The Baden-Württemberg-class frigates are equipped with one 127mm main gun, two 27mm auto cannons and seven 12.7mm machine guns for defence against air and surface targets. The vessels are also armed with non-lethal weapons, such as water cannons and searchlights for non-provocative deterrence and defence. Beyond capabilities that might be provided by the ship's helicopter(s), sensors for anti-submarine warfare have not been integrated into the platform while the ship's air defence capability is limited to relatively short-range point defence systems.

Problems
The lead ship – Baden-Württemberg – was initially delivered with several problems. These included a persistent 1.3° list to starboard and the fact that the ship was dramatically overweight which would limit its performance, increase its cost of operation, and most importantly, adversely affect the German Navy's ability to add future upgrades to the somewhat sparsely outfitted vessel. Furthermore, there were also problems with the frigate's operations room from where the highly automated ship will be controlled. As a result, the German defense procurement agency BAAINBw refused to commission the vessel, making it the first time in German naval history that the BAAINBw has refused to commission a ship and returned it to its builder.

Baden-Württemberg was eventually accepted by the BAAINBw on 30 April 2019 and commissioned in June 2019, over two years later than originally planned.

While all vessels in the class had been delivered by January 2022, full operational capability for the first ship in the class, Baden-Württemberg, was still only expected in mid-2023.

Ships in the class

Gallery

See also
 List of naval ship classes in service

Similar ships
 , a Spanish frigate design adopted by the Australian, Norwegian and Spanish navies.
 Type 26 frigate, a British frigate design
 , an Indian stealth class
 FREMM multipurpose frigate, French/Italian collaboration
 , of the Danish Navy has roughly the same displacement

References

External links

 F125 at Blohm + Voss Naval
 F125 project details on Naval Technology
 Germany’s F125 Special Forces and Stabilization Frigates